George Boyle Hanna, KC (17 December 1877 – 30 October 1938) was a Northern Irish barrister, unionist politician and county court judge.

He was born at Linen Hall Street in Ballymena, County Antrim, the son of auctioneer Robert Hanna and Mary Jane Kennedy. He was educated at Gracehill Academy, Ballymena Academy and Trinity College, Dublin and was first admitted as a solicitor in 1901, being called to the Bar in 1920, taking silk as a King's Counsel in 1933. He was a member of Antrim County Council from 1908 to 1921.

From 1919 until 1922, he was the independent Unionist Member of the UK Parliament for East Antrim, narrowly beating an official Unionist candidate in a by-election, but standing down at the 1922 general election.

From 1921 to 1937, he served as an official Unionist in the Parliament of Northern Ireland, first representing County Antrim (1921–29) and then Larne until his appointment as a county court judge for County Tyrone in 1937. He was Parliamentary Secretary to the Ministry of Home Affairs from 1925 to 1937. He only served as a judge for six months, dying soon after his appointment.

Personal life

He was married in December 1903 to Susanna "Sunnie" Mack and had two children – George and Mary.

References

External links

 
 

1877 births
1938 deaths
Independent members of the House of Commons of the United Kingdom
Members of the Parliament of the United Kingdom for County Antrim constituencies (since 1922)
UK MPs 1918–1922
Ulster Unionist Party members of the House of Commons of Northern Ireland
Members of the House of Commons of Northern Ireland 1921–1925
Members of the House of Commons of Northern Ireland 1925–1929
Members of the House of Commons of Northern Ireland 1929–1933
Members of the House of Commons of Northern Ireland 1933–1938
Northern Ireland junior government ministers (Parliament of Northern Ireland)
Solicitors from Northern Ireland
Independent politicians in Northern Ireland
Alumni of Trinity College Dublin
Judges in Northern Ireland
People educated at Ballymena Academy
Northern Ireland King's Counsel
Members of the House of Commons of Northern Ireland for County Antrim constituencies
People from Ballymena
Politicians from County Antrim
Members of Armagh County Council